Angakusajaujuq: The Shaman's Apprentice is a Canadian animated short film, directed by Zacharias Kunuk and released in 2021.

Summary
A story about the traditional Inuit role of the shaman, the film centres on a grandmother (Madeline Ivalu) and granddaughter (Lucy Tulugarjuk) who travel to the underworld in an effort to heal an ill young hunter (Jacky Qrunnut).

Release
The film was released alongside a children's picture book of the story, written by Kunuk and illustrated by Megan Kyak-Monteith. The book was published in both English and Inuktitut; the latter edition won the 2021 Indigenous Voices Award for work published in an indigenous language.

The film premiered at the 2021 Annecy International Animation Film Festival, where it won the FIPRESCI Award. It had its Canadian premiere at the 2021 Toronto International Film Festival, where it won the award for Best Canadian Short Film.

Reception
The film was named to TIFF's annual year-end Canada's Top Ten list for 2021. It was subsequently named to the initial shortlist for the Academy Award for Best Animated Short Film for the 94th Academy Awards, and won the Canadian Screen Award for Best Animated Short at the 10th Canadian Screen Awards in 2022.

It also won Best Independent Short Film at the Festival Stop Montreal.

References

External links

2020s English-language films
2021 animated films
2021 short films
English-language Canadian films
Canadian animated short films
Films directed by Zacharias Kunuk
Films about Inuit in Canada
Inuktitut-language films
Best Animated Short Film Genie and Canadian Screen Award winners
2020s Canadian films
2021 independent films
Canadian independent films